Sonia Malavisi (born 31 October 1994) is an Italian pole vaulter.

Biography
A fellow Roman like her compatriot Roberta Bruni, she also comes from the Artistic Gymnastics. At the pole vault, her junior personal best (4.42 m) is the second best junior world performance in 2013 and 49th at senior level.

By clearing 4.50m at Castiglione della Pescaia on 17 May 2016, she qualified for the 2016 Olympic Games in Rio de Janeiro, where she ranked 21st, clearing 4.45m.

Her personal best is 4.51m on 17 July 2016 during the 30th Meeting Internazionale Città di Padova.

National records
Junior
 Pole vault: 4.42 m ( Rieti, 5 July 2013) - Current holder

Progression

Pole vault outdoor

Achievements

National titles
Senior (4)
 Italian Athletics Championships
 Pole vault: 2015, 2016
 Italian Athletics Indoor Championships
 Pole vault: 2016, 2019

She also won one youth (2011) and one junior (2013) individual national championship.

See also
Italian all-time lists - Pole vault

References

External links
 
 

1994 births
Italian female pole vaulters
Living people
Athletes (track and field) at the 2016 Summer Olympics
Olympic athletes of Italy
Athletes from Rome
Athletics competitors of Fiamme Gialle
Italian Athletics Championships winners